Yuji Miyai (born 4 January 1978) is a Japanese sailor. He competed in the men's 470 event at the 2000 Summer Olympics.

References

External links
 

1978 births
Living people
Japanese male sailors (sport)
Olympic sailors of Japan
Sailors at the 2000 Summer Olympics – 470
Sportspeople from Tokyo